The Williams FW38 is a Formula One racing car designed by Williams to compete in the 2016 Formula One season. The car was driven by Felipe Massa and Valtteri Bottas.  

The FW38 used the Mercedes PU106C Hybrid power unit.

Due to a lack of upgrades to the car, which was similar to the Williams FW37, the team eventually lost 4th place in the constructors' championship to Force India.

History
The car proved to be competitive in the early stages of the championship, with Massa and Bottas securing points finishes for the first half of the season. However, lack of upgrades on the car meant that the team could not keep up with other teams during the later stages, such as Ferrari, Force India, and Red Bull Racing, and eventually lost 4th place in the constructors' championship to Force India.

Complete Formula One results
(key) (results in bold indicate pole position; results in italics indicate fastest lap)

 Driver failed to finish the race but was classified as they had completed greater than 90% of the race distance.

References

External links

 Details about the car from Williams Martini Racing 

Williams Formula One cars
2016 Formula One season cars